The Annam limestone babbler (Gypsophila annamensis), also known as the khướu đá hoa in Vietnamese, is a species of bird in the family Pellorneidae.
It is native to the limestone hills of northern Indochina. It was formerly considered a subspecies of the variable limestone babbler (G. crispifrons) but a 2020 study recovered it as a distinct species.

Its natural habitats are subtropical or tropical moist lowland forest and subtropical or tropical moist montane forest.

References

 
Collar, N. J. & Robson, C. 2007. Family Timaliidae (Babblers)  pp. 70 – 291 in; del Hoyo, J., Elliott, A. & Christie, D.A. eds. Handbook of the Birds of the World, Vol. 12. Picathartes to Tits and Chickadees. Lynx Edicions, Barcelona.

Annam limestone babbler
Annam limestone babbler